St. Mary's Cathedral is a Catholic cathedral located in Ogdensburg, New York, United States. It is the seat of the Diocese of Ogdensburg. St. Mary's parish was founded in 1827. The original St. Mary's Cathedral was located at Montgomery and Franklin Streets. The cornerstone was laid in 1855 and it was destroyed in a fire on November 25, 1947. The current cathedral was completed in 1952 and consecrated on October 22 of that year.

See also
List of Catholic cathedrals in the United States
List of cathedrals in the United States
List of cathedrals in New York

References

External links

Official Cathedral website
Diocese of Ogdensburg official website

Religious organizations established in 1827
Roman Catholic churches completed in 1952
Mary in Ogdensburg
Roman Catholic churches in New York (state)
Gothic Revival church buildings in New York (state)
Churches in St. Lawrence County, New York
1827 establishments in New York (state)
Roman Catholic parishes in the Diocese of Ogdensburg
20th-century Roman Catholic church buildings in the United States